Felsőpakony is a village in Pest county, Budapest metropolitan area, Hungary. It has a population of 3,661 (2019).

References

Populated places in Pest County